The Life and Work of Sigmund Freud is a biography of Sigmund Freud, the founder of psychoanalysis, by the psychoanalyst Ernest Jones. The most famous and influential biography of Freud, the work was originally published in three volumes (first volume 1953, second volume 1955, third volume 1957) by Hogarth Press; a one-volume edition abridged by literary critics Lionel Trilling and Steven Marcus followed in 1961. When first published, The Life and Work of Sigmund Freud was acclaimed, and sales exceeded expectations. Although the biography has retained its status as a classic, Jones has been criticized for presenting an overly favorable image of Freud. Jones has also been criticized for being biased in his treatment of rival psychoanalysts such as Otto Rank and Sándor Ferenczi.

Summary

Jones aims to "record the main facts of Freud's life" and "to try to relate his personality and the experiences of his life to the development of his ideas." He criticizes previous biographies of Freud for their "distortions and untruths." Subjects addressed include Freud's relationship with the physiologist Ernst von Fleischl-Marxow, and with the psychoanalysts Sándor Ferenczi and Otto Rank.

Background and publication history

According to the philosopher Mikkel Borch-Jacobsen and the psychologist Sonu Shamdasani, the events leading to the writing of The Life and Work of Sigmund Freud occurred as follows. Leon Shimkin, director of Simon & Schuster, contacted Jones in October 1946, to ask whether he was interested in writing a biography of Freud. Jones in turn contacted Sigmund Freud's daughter, the psychoanalyst Anna Freud. Jones had recently taken sides with the psychoanalyst Melanie Klein in her dispute with Anna Freud. Consequently, Anna Freud was unsure how much she could trust Jones, and suggested that he collaborate with her friend the psychologist Siegfried Bernfeld. However, Bernfeld was even more suspicious of Jones than Anna Freud was, and was working on his own biography of Freud. Nevertheless, Bernfeld was willing to work with Jones. After Jones displeased Anna Freud by writing a preface to Freud's The Question of Lay Analysis (1926) with which she disagreed, she asked the psychoanalyst Ernst Kris to inform Shimkin that she was considering withdrawing her agreement to Jones writing the book. Shimkin replied that Bernfeld should be entrusted with the task, with Anna Freud's assistance. Anna Freud did not wish to directly participate in writing the book, and therefore proposed instead that it should be written by Bernfeld and Kris. In September 1947, the publisher offered Jones a contract. Nothing followed from this until 1950, when Jones wrote to Bernfeld to ask for his collaboration, along the lines originally discussed.

Bernfeld offered to place his research at Jones' disposal. He closely collaborated with Jones. Jones questioned Bernfeld on numerous matters, including Freud's date of birth, his essay on 'Screen memories', and his relations with the philosopher Franz Brentano and the psychiatrist Theodor Meynert. Bernfeld undertook research to help Jones and corrected the drafts of Jones' chapters. The psychoanalyst James Strachey also collaborated on the volume. Jones eventually gained the confidence of the Freud family, after showing the first chapters of the book to Anna Freud. In April 1952, the Freud family showed Jones the letters that Sigmund Freud and Martha Bernays wrote to each other during their engagement. Bernfeld, however, lost Anna Freud's support during this period, as she believed that his research tended towards sensationalism. She became so appalled at what she saw as Bernfeld's intrusions into private matters that she decided to stop replying to his requests for information. In discussing Freud's use of cocaine, Jones nevertheless relied on an article by Bernfeld.

The Life and Work of Sigmund Freud was originally published in three volumes (first volume 1953, second volume 1955, third volume 1957) by Hogarth Press; a one-volume edition abridged by literary critics Lionel Trilling and Steven Marcus followed in 1961.

Reception
According to Borch-Jacobsen and Shamdasani, The Life and Work of Sigmund Freud was acclaimed, and sales exceeded expectations, with 15,000 copies being sold in the first two weeks after publication in New York City alone. They state that the work was reviewed in periodicals such as the Manchester Guardian, which wrote that Jones had "drawn the portrait of a man who deserves to be acclaimed, by general consent, among the greatest of any age", while the psychologist Bruno Bettelheim adopted a more critical view of the work, accusing Jones of multiple "errors and omissions", and of lacking objectivity. Borch-Jacobsen and Shamdasani credit Bettelheim with being the first observer to point out that The Life and Work of Sigmund Freud relied on restricted documents and correspondence held by the Sigmund Freud Archives, making it impossible to determine its accuracy.

Borch-Jacobsen and Shamdasani maintain that Jones provides a misleading account of Freud's experimentation with cocaine: according to them, Jones' statement that cocaine "had for some time helped" to control the symptoms of Fleischl-Marxow's withdrawal from morphine is "vague and misleading" and "aimed at explaining how Freud could have made false claims for success in his 1884 and 1885 articles." They called the book "a brilliant dramatisation of the Freudian legend", writing that Jones "was past master in the art of utilising documents and accounts to which he alone had access to flesh out and confirm Freud's accounts whilst eliding the contradictions" and guilty of major omissions. Borch-Jacobsen and Shamdasani accused Jones of exaggerating the extent to which early reviews of Freud's works were negative, and of falsely portraying Freud as puritanical.

Other critics of the book include the former psychoanalyst Jeffrey Moussaieff Masson, the psychologist Hans Eysenck, the historian Roy Porter, the historian R. Andrew Paskauskas, and the author Richard Webster. Eysenck described the book as the "most famous" biography of Freud, but saw it as "more a mythology than a history", charging Jones with suppressing data which might reflect unfavourably on Freud. Porter described the work as "hagiographical and bowdlerized". Paskauskas criticized Jones for altering Freud's English in his use of his correspondence with Freud. He wrote that while Jones stated that he had not altered Freud's grammar, there are "many dissimilarities of spelling, grammar, and punctuation between the letters quoted in Jones's published biography and Freud's originals." He accused Jones of errors in his citations of Freud's letters, such as mistakenly citing his letters to Freud as letters from Freud. Webster wrote that Jones was unreliable and replaced hostile accounts of Freud with an overly positive account.

Mixed evaluations of the book include those of the psychologist Frank Sulloway, the historian of science Roger Smith, the psychologist Louis Breger, and the psychiatrist E. James Lieberman and the consultant Robert Kramer. Sulloway described the book as "monumental", writing that it had "deservedly remained the definitive and indispensable" biographical source about Freud. Nevertheless, he distanced himself from Jones' understanding of Freud, criticizing Jones for failing to admit that psychoanalysis owes its fundamental theoretical inspirations to biological sources. He also described the book as the "fullest expression of the Freud legend". Smith wrote that it is an "official biography, replaced in detail but still of interest". Breger considered the book biased due to its status as an official biography, as well as its author's active role in the psychoanalytic movement and hostility to other analysts, including Rank and Ferenczi. He nevertheless saw the book as valuable because of its "wealth of detailed, firsthand material". Lieberman and Kramer wrote that the book is the most influential biography of Freud. They also observed that Jones knew Freud for decades and had access to letters of Freud that were only published in full after 1990. However, they believed that Jones had a partisan view of his rivals Ferenczi and Rank.

Positive evaluations of the book include those of the historian Peter Gay, the philosophers Jerome Neu and Richard Wollheim, and the sociologist Christopher Badcock. Gay described the book as "beautifully informed", and called it "the classic biography of Freud", adding that it "contains many astute judgments" despite Jones' poor style and tendency to "separate the man and the work." Gay criticized the idea that Jones, motivated by jealousy, was scathing about rivals such as Ferenczi, maintaining that while exception has been taken to Jones' suggestion that in his last years Ferenczi was subject to psychotic episodes, it "echoes the opinion that Freud expressed in an unpublished letter to Jones." Neu identified The Life and Work of Sigmund Freud and Gay's Freud: A Life for Our Time (1988) as the two most useful biographies of Freud. Wollheim called The Life and Work of Sigmund Freud a "great" biography, but observed that while Jones had the advantage of knowing Freud and his associates, he was able to write only what Anna Freud found acceptable. Wollheim observed that Jones alternated between discussion of Freud's life and discussion of his thought. In 1992, Badcock stated that despite the criticism it had received, the work "remains unrivalled and is the only biography to include summaries of all Freud's works known at the time of writing."

References

Bibliography
Books

 
 
 
 
 
 
 
 
 
 
 
 
 
 
 
 

1953 non-fiction books
1955 non-fiction books
1957 non-fiction books
1961 non-fiction books
Basic Books books
Books about Sigmund Freud
Books by Ernest Jones
English-language books